Kundagavayal  is a village in the Avadaiyarkoil revenue block of Pudukkottai district, Tamil Nadu, India.

About Kundagavayal 
According to Census 2011, the location code or village code of Kundagavayal village is 639762. Kundagavayal village is located in Aranthangi Tehsil of Pudukkottai district in Tamil Nadu, India. It is situated 6 km (3.72 mi) away from sub-district headquarter Aranthangi and 40 km (24.85 mi) away from district headquarter Pudukkottai. As per 2009 stats, Kundagavayal village is also a gram panchayat.

The total geographical area of village is 189.21 hectares. Kundagavayal has a total population of 258. There are about 66 houses in Kundagavayal village. Aranthangi is nearest town to Kundagavayal.

Total Population - 953

Male Population - 473

Female Population - 480

Transport 
Private mini Bus Service connects the village to the Town aranthangi

Private and government bus service near 1 km (0.6 mi) in Duraiyarasapuram connects all town

Railway Station Available within 5 km (3.1 mi) distance at Aranthagi which connects the Karaikudi- pattukottai

List of educational institutions nearby

Primary schools 

 Government Primary School, Kundagavayal
 Government Primary School, Duraiyarasapuram
 Government Primary School, Keelacheri
 Government Higher secondary schools
 Government Boys Higher Secondary School, Aranthangi
 Government Girls Higher Secondary School, Aranthangi

Private schools 

 Ali Jainam Jamaath Oriental Arabic Higher Secondary School, Aranthangi
 Doctors School, Melappattu
 Ideal matric Hr. Sec. School, Aranthangi
 Annai Meenachi Natchiar Matriculation Higher secondary School, Aranthangi
 Laurel Matriculation Higher Secondary School, Aranthangi
 National Matric Higher Secondary School, Aranthangi
 Selection Matriculation Higher Secondary School, Aranthangi
 Shivaani Vidhyaa Mandir, Aranthangi
 St.John's Matric Hr. Sec. School, Arantangi
 St.Joseph Nursery and Primary School, Aranthangi
 T.E.L.C Middle school, Aranthangi
 Thayagam Matriculation Hr. Sec. School, Aranthangi
 Vestley group of institutions, Aranthangi
 Yazh Academy, Silattur, Aranthangi

Technical Colleges 

 Government polytechnic College, Aranthangi
 Government Arts and Science College Aranthangi
 M.S. Polytechnic college
 Bharathidasan University Model College, Punniavasal
 Annai Khadeeja Arts And Science College, Mumpalai

Pond areas

Pongal Celebrations

Pillayar Temple

Pidari Amman Temple

Ayyanar Temple

Kamatchi Amman Temple

Nearby Villages of Kundagavayal panchayat 

 Veeramangalam
 Perunavalur
 Panjatti
 Amanji
 Allaraimelvayal
 Keelacheri
 Sivandankadu
 Vengur
 Sinamangalam
 Arunachalapuram
 Mannakudi

Demographics 

As per the 2001 census, Kundagavayal had a total population of 953 with 473 males and 480 females. Out of the total population 732 people were literate.

References

Villages in Pudukkottai district